A market house is a covered space historically used as a marketplace to exchange goods and services such as provisions or livestock, sometimes combined with spaces for public or civic functions on the upper floors and often with a jail or lockup in the cellar or basement floor. Market houses usually included an arcade to protect traders and their goods from the elements while maintaining private access to most of the building.

After this style of market building developed in British market towns, it spread to colonial territories of Great Britain, including Ireland and New England in America. A market house is typically located on a market square, quay or wharf in a central accessible area for the ease of transit of goods and people.

More contemporary market halls are often similar to food halls.

Gallery

See also
 Market (place)
 Market hall and Market hall (disambiguation)
 Market town
 Market square
 Moot hall
 Market halls in Berlin
 Market houses in Northern Ireland
 Market houses in the Republic of Ireland
 Stock exchange
 Tholsel (Ireland) and Tolbooth (Scotland)

References

 
Vernacular architecture
Seats of local government